The 1927 Estonian Football Championship was the seventh top-division football league season in Estonia. Nine teams, seven from Tallinn and one from Pärnu took part in the league. It was played as a knock-out tournament. VS Sport Tallinn won the championship.

Quarter-finals

Semi-finals

Final

Top Goalscorers 
 Karl-Richard Idlane (VS Sport Tallinn) - 6 goals
 Aleksander Gerassimov (VS Sport Tallinn) - 6 goals

References

Estonian Football Championship
1